N-acylethanolamine acid amide hydrolase (NAAA)  is a member of the choloylglycine hydrolase family, a subset of the N-terminal nucleophile hydrolase superfamily. NAAA has a molecular weight of 31 kDa. The activation and inhibition of its catalytic site is of medical interest as a potential treatment for obesity and chronic pain. While it was discovered within the last decade, its structural similarity to the more familiar acid ceramidase (AC) and functional similarity to fatty acid amide hydrolase (FAAH) allow it to be studied extensively.

Mechanism
The overall enzyme mechanism involves cleavage into two chains, one of which contains the catalytic nucleophile, believed to be a cysteine residue. Unlike FAAH, which operates in basic conditions, this enzyme must operate under acidic conditions (pH ~4.5), and is completely inactivated at a pH of 8. Selective inhibitors of NAAA are ester and amide compounds, such as N-cyclohexanecarbonylpentadecylamine. NAAA is cleaved proteolytically at residue Cys-126. NAAA cleaves C-N non-peptide bonds in linear amides, particularly ethanolamides. Its mechanism is quite similar to that of AC, which is further supported by AC's ability to cleave N-acylethanolamines (NAEs), albeit at far lower rates and with different specificities. While mechanistic details are not very well known, catalytic activity of NAAA is thought to be activated by Cys-126 and Asp-145.

Structure
Currently, there is little information about NAAA's tertiary structure, due to its low homology to any of the other enzymes in the choloylglycine hydrolase family for which there is significant 3-dimensional structural information. In humans, this enzyme contains 359 residues. NAAA's primary structure is nearly identical to that of acid ceramidase (AC), whose only difference is the substitution of Leu at the 334th residue, for phenylalanine. The enzyme must be N-glycosylated at six sites in order for the enzyme to operate at its maximum activity level, all of which have the peptide sequence, Asn-Xxx-Ser/Thr. Unlike AC, NAAA does not form a heterodimer through disulfide bonds, but rather remains active as two separate cleaved peptides following hydrolysis.

Biological function
Fatty acid ethanolamines (FAEs) perform several physiological functions, most notably serving as messengers for pain and inflammation. NAAA's are found primarily in the lysosomal compartment of macrophages, in line with most inflammation-related proteins. The gene that codes for the protein is 4q21.1. There, they perform FAE hydrolysis, the final step in the signaling cascade for pain and inflammation, yielding an ethanolamine and a fatty acid. While it processes the cleavage of many different substrates, NAAA is most active with the substrate N-palmitoylethanolamine, suggesting that this is one of the key messengers of pain. NAAA activity in rats is highest in the lungs, while in humans it is highest in the liver, so there is cross-species variability in the enzyme's selective activity.

Disease relevance
Recent studies suggest that NAAA has significance in two widespread human conditions: chronic pain and obesity. Current research focuses on inhibiting the NAAA hydrolytic active site in order to control inflammation. It is still ambiguous as to whether reduced inflammation is correlated to reduced pain. ARN077, a β-lactone, has been one of the most intensely tested NAAA inhibitors, with the strongest promise of inhibition, as it blocks the catalytic cysteine via a thioester bond. The lack of homology between NAAA and FAAH makes NAAA-specific targeting drugs far more feasible. However, because the fatty acid concentration circulating throughout one's bloodstream is positively correlated with obesity, decreased NAAA activity is thought to be correlated with obesity.

Industrial relevance
While no drugs targeting NAAA have entered the market yet, there is currently substantial research being done on the activation, and specific targeting and inhibition of NAAA. Activation of NAAA is spurred by the addition of phospholipids, and targeted inhibition by different buffers. Findings in these areas may be able to develop drugs to combat chronic pain and obesity.

Evolution
While NAAA operates much like fatty acid amide hydrolase (HUGO gene symbol: FAAH), the two enzymes are not homologous.

On the other hand, NAAA is homologous to acid ceramidase (HUGO gene symbol: ASAH1), sharing 30% sequence identity at the amino acid level in humans ENSEMBL.

Historical significance
NAAA was discovered in 2007 as an alternative source of anandamide hydrolysis. Previously, FAAH was the only known enzyme to be responsible for the degradation of these endocannabinoids, functioning in a pH range of 8.5-10. NAAA's discovery served as an explanation for endocannabinoids and anti-inflammatory ethanolamines in acidic environments, as its peak functionality is found at a pH ~4.5-5. Because of its functional role similar to FAAH, it offers another option for drug development.

See also

References

External Links 
 N-acylethanolamine acid amidase (gene name: NAAA ((ASAHL)) - Human Protein Atlas

Hydrolases